Edward Phennah  (born 1859) was a Welsh international footballer. A goalkeeper, he represented Wales on one occasion, becoming one of the first English born players to represent the country, on 23 March 1878 during a 9–0 defeat against Scotland. Phennah played for Wrexham at club level, playing in the club's first competitive fixture in the inaugural Welsh Cup in the 1877–78 season. His three consecutive clean sheets in the tournament remains a club record for a goalkeeper playing in his first three matches, keeping his third clean sheet in a 1–0 victory over Druids in the final of the competition.

Honours

Wrexham

Welsh Cup
Winners: 1877–78

See also
 List of Wales international footballers (alphabetical)
 List of Wales international footballers born outside Wales

References

1859 births
Welsh footballers
Wales international footballers
Wrexham A.F.C. players
Place of birth missing
Year of death missing
Association football goalkeepers